Générac is a railway station in Générac, Gard, Occitanie, southern France. Within TER Occitanie, it is part of line 26 (Nîmes-Le Grau-du-Roi).

References

Railway stations in Gard